Si fueras tú is a Spanish thriller streaming television series starring María Pedraza, Óscar Casas, Nerea Elizalde, Lucía Díez and Jorge Motos that originally aired in 2017. Produced by RTVE in collaboration with Atomis Media, it consists of an adaptation of the New Zealand teen show Reservoir Hill.

Premise 
The starting point of the fiction concerns the arrival of Alba, a 17-year-old girl, to a new neighborhood. She is strikingly similar to another girl, Cris, who disappeared half a year earlier.

Cast

Production and release 
Si fueras tú is an adaptation of the New Zealand series Reservoir Hill, and it was produced by RTVE in collaboration with Atomis Media. Isabel Raventós was credited as executive producer. The series began shooting by August 2017 in Madrid.
Except the 20-minute-long pilot episode, the rest of episodes do not reach a running time much longer than 10 minutes. The series was presented as a trans-media project where viewers could decide on the direction of the plot, and in which the production crew hence would face the challenge of quickly creating, shooting and wrapping each episodes in barely 5 days based on the audience's decisions. The pilot premiered on 11 September 2017. The broadcasting run ended on 30 October 2017. A 80-minute-long TV movie cut was broadcast on the RTVE's flagship free-to-air channel La 1 in December 2017. The release of the series served to promote the kickstart of the RTVE's streaming platform playz, which entered operation on 30 October 2017.

References 
Citations

Bibliography
 
 

Spanish-language television shows
Television shows filmed in Spain
2010s Spanish drama television series
Spanish thriller television series
2017 Spanish television series debuts
2017 Spanish television series endings
Television series about teenagers
Playz original programming
Transmedia storytelling
Spanish teen drama television series
Spanish television series based on non-Spanish television series
Non-New Zealand television series based on New Zealand television series